The men's 200 metres event at the 1993 Summer Universiade was held at the UB Stadium in Buffalo, United States on 16 and 17 July 1993.

Medalists

Results

Heats
Wind:Heat 3: +4.4 m/s, Heat 8: -1.6 m/s

Quarterfinals

Wind:Heat 1: +2.3 m/s, Heat 2: +3.4 m/s, Heat 3: +3.5 m/s, Heat 4: ? m/s

Semifinals
Wind:Heat 1: +2.8 m/s, Heat 2: +1.5 m/s

Final

Wind: +2.4 m/s

References

Athletics at the 1993 Summer Universiade
1993